Sukinda Road railway station is a railway station on the East Coast Railway network in the state of Odisha, India. It serves Sukinda Road. Its code is SKND. It has one platforms. Passenger, Express trains halt at Sukinda Road railway station.

Major trains
 Puri–Barbil Express
 Visakhapatnam–Tatanagar Weekly Superfast Express

See also
 Jajpur district

References

Railway stations in Jajpur district
Khurda Road railway division